Nicholas Charles Papadopulos (born 1966) is a Church of England priest and the Dean of Salisbury.

Biography
Papadopulos was born in 1966. He was educated at the King's School, Rochester, before gaining a degree in history from Gonville and Caius College, Cambridge. After studying law at City University, London, he worked as a barrister practising criminal law for seven years. He then studied for ordination at Ripon College, Cuddesdon. He was the vicar of St Peter's Church, Eaton Square, from 2007 to 2013, and previously served in the dioceses of Salisbury and Portsmouth.

He was canon treasurer of Canterbury Cathedral from 2013, and was instituted Dean of Salisbury at Salisbury Cathedral on 9 September 2018.

He is the editor of God's Transforming Work (2011), an assessment of the development of Common Worship in its first 10 years, to which he contributed an appreciation of the ministry of Bishop David Stancliffe. 

He is married with two children.

References

External links
 Canterbury Cathedral profile
 Church and Community Fund staff profile

Living people
21st-century English Anglican priests
Deans of Salisbury
1966 births
People educated at King's School, Rochester
Alumni of Gonville and Caius College, Cambridge
Alumni of City, University of London
Alumni of Ripon College Cuddesdon